John Neeson is the co-founder and current managing director of the global business-to-business (B2B) research and advisory firm SiriusDecisions.

He previously worked as a senior executive at the information technology research firm Gartner, where he was responsible for helping to develop the concept of enterprise resource planning. In 1998, Neeson launched ExecutiveEdge magazine, a publication sponsored by Forbes and Gartner.

As the SiriusDecisions managing director since 2001, along with Richard Eldh, Neeson has been responsible for developing the "Demand Waterfall" marketing operations model, which is widely used by B2B companies to describe and measure their lead-to-revenue funnel. He regularly comments on marketing industry topics, including marketing technology and geographical marketing.

Neeson received a Bachelor of Arts in economics from Ithaca College.

References

American marketing people
Living people
American business executives
Ithaca College alumni
Year of birth missing (living people)